Bükk National Park is a national park in the Bükk Mountains of Northern Hungary, near Miskolc. It was founded in 1977 as the third national park in the country. It contains 431.3 km2 (of which 37.74 km2 is under increased protection). Mountainous and forested, Bükk is Hungary's largest national park and is situated in the northern mountains, between Szilvásvárad and Lillafüred. Bükk's important geological features include various karst formations within its limestone mountains - particularly caves (once inhabited by pre-historic people), swallow-holes, and ravines. The country's longest (4,000 metres) and deepest (245 metres) cave, Istvánlápa, is located in the park. Bükk National Park also contains ninety species of nesting birds, some considered endangered.

The Vatican Climate Forest was to be located within the Park. KlimaFa ("Climate Trees") was started by a San Francisco promoter, Russ George, who promised a carbon offsetting project, intended to offset the Vatican's carbon dioxide emissions. However, no trees have been planted. In an interview with the Christian Science Monitor, Lajos Kiss, mayor of the village of Tiszakeszi pointed out an empty area along the Tisza River where the trees were supposed to be planted. The Monitor also said the Vatican was considering "legal action in order to defend the Vatican’s reputation."

See also 
List of national parks of Hungary
Bükk culture

References

External links

Official website of the park
Description of geology, fauna and flora
Bukk Mountains Britannica.com

National parks of Hungary
Geography of Borsod-Abaúj-Zemplén County
Geography of Heves County
Protected areas of the Western Carpathians
Protected areas established in 1976
1976 establishments in Hungary
Tourist attractions in Borsod-Abaúj-Zemplén County
Tourist attractions in Heves County